Count Pyotr Aleksandrovich Tolstoy (1769 – 28 September 1844) was a Russian general and statesman.

Pyotr Tolstoy came from the Oryol branch of the Tolstoy family, his father Alexander Tolstoy was a grandson of Count Pyotr Andreyevich Tolstoy. In 1775 he was enrolled in the Leib Guard Preobrazhensky regiment and started the service on 21 May 1785 as an aide-de-camp of the staff of Prince Nikolai Saltykov. In the same year he was promoted to lieutenant colonel. In 1788–1790 he participated in the Gustav III's Russian War.

In 1794 he was prominent in the Siege of Warsaw and then promoted to colonel. On 24 October 1794 he commanded two battalions in the Battle of Praga. On return, Empress Catherine II awarded Tolstoy the Order of St. George of the 3rd degree with her own hand and appointed him the chief of the Pskov Dragoon regiment. On 9 November 1797 he obtained the rank of major general with appointment the chief of the Nizhny Novgorod Dragoon regiment and in the next year received the Order of St. Anna of the 1st degree.

In the end of 1798 he was sent to Archduke Charles of Austria for the communication with Alexander Suvorov. After the Campaigns of 1799 he was promoted to lieutenant general and became a member of the War Collegium and of the Governing Senate. In 1802 he was appointed the war governor of Vyborg and in the next year of St Petersburg. At this post Tolstoy became famous by his generosity, giving out money to poor and soldiers of guard regiments. In this time he also commanded the Preobrazhensky regiment.

In September 1805 he departed with 20,000 landing corps into Pomerania and operated in the North Germany under the general command of King Gustav IV Adolf of Sweden. He captured Hanover and returned to Russia after the battle of Austerlitz. In the beginning of the War of the Fourth Coalition Emperor Alexander sent Tolstoy to reconcile Corps Commanders Bennigsen and Buxhoeveden and to report about their quarrel personally to himself. After the Bennigsen's appointment the commander-in-chief, Tolstoy became on-duty General of the latter.

From 14 October 1807 to 1 October 1808 he was the ambassador in Paris. His main objective was to observe the Treaty of Tilsit, and Tolstoy wrote to Alexander that all friendly assurances of Napoleon are mendacious, he entreated him not to believe them, but to prepare for the rebuff in advance, and predicted the forthcoming French invasion of Russia. He recommended to the Russian government a system of measures for the protection of the interests of Russia against possible aggression from Napoleon: to greatly increase the size of the army, to move it to the Western borders, to conclude a secret agreement with Austria, to finish the war with Turkey and Sweden, to conclude peace with England and to organize a new anti-French coalition with Prussia and Austria. Because of his lack of diplomatic experience, however, his efforts were useless and after the Congress of Erfurt Tolstoy was recalled. However, Tolstoy nevertheless observed worsening in the relations between Aleksander and Napoleon.

From 1809 to 1812 he lived in his estate near Tula. In 1812 he formed and then commanded the militia of Nizhny Novgorod, Simbirsk, Kazan, Vyatka and Orenburg governorates. In 1813 he participated in the taking of Dresden and Magdeburg.

On 19 June 1814 he was promoted to Full General, on 16 January 1816 appointed the chief of the 4th and then 5th infantry regiment. From 30 August 1823 he was a member of the State Council. During the reign of Emperor Nicholas I he received the Order of St. Andrew and took a different military post.

From 1839 he was in retirement. Pyotr Tolstoy died in Moscow and was buried in the Donskoy Monastery.

External links and references
 
  Article in the Dictionary of the Russian generals

1769 births
1844 deaths
Politicians of the Russian Empire
Russian generals
Counts of the Russian Empire
Pyotr Aleksandrovich
Russian commanders of the Napoleonic Wars
Members of the State Council (Russian Empire)
Russian people of the November Uprising
Russian people of the Kościuszko Uprising
Russian people of the Polish–Russian War of 1792
Recipients of the Order of St. George of the Third Degree
Ambassadors of the Russian Empire to France